Jon Hilliman (born November 14, 1995) is an American football running back for the San Antonio Brahmas of the XFL. He played college football at Rutgers, and was signed by the Giants as an undrafted free agent in 2019.

Early years
Raised in Plainfield, New Jersey, Hilliman attended and played high school football at St. Peter's Preparatory School.

College career 
After playing for Boston College from 2014-2017, Hilliman graduated and transferred to Rutgers as a graduate transfer. He led the team in rushing touchdowns as a redshirt senior at Rutgers.

Collegiate statistics

Professional career

New York Giants 
After going undrafted in the 2019 NFL Draft, Hilliman signed with the New York Giants. He was waived on August 31, 2019 and was signed to the practice squad the next day. He was promoted to the active roster on September 26, 2019.  Hilliman made his first start with the Giants in Week 6 against the New England Patriots due to injuries suffered by starter Saquon Barkley and his backup Wayne Gallman.  In the game, Hilliman rushed 11 times for 38 yards and lost a fumble when Jamie Collins stripped the ball out and Kyle Van Noy returned it for a touchdown in the 35-14 loss. Hilliman was waived by the Giants on October 11, 2019 in order for them to sign veteran running back Javorius Allen, and later re-signed to the practice squad. He signed a reserve/future contract with the Giants on December 30, 2019. He was waived on August 2, 2020.

San Antonio Brahmas 
Hilliman was drafted by the San Antonio Brahmas of the XFL on November 18, 2022.

References

External links
Twitter
New York Giants bio
Boston College Eagles bio

1995 births
Living people
Players of American football from New Jersey
American football running backs
Boston College Eagles football players
All-American college football players
Rutgers Scarlet Knights football players
Sportspeople from Plainfield, New Jersey
St. Peter's Preparatory School alumni
New York Giants players
San Antonio Brahmas players